The 2020–21 Girabola was the 43rd season of top-tier football in Angola. The season was held from 26 December 2020 until 29 June 2021.

The league comprised 16 teams and the bottom three teams were relegated to the 2021–22 Provincial stages.

Sagrada Esperança won the title while Baixa de Cassanje, Santa Rita de Cássia and Ferroviário do Huambo were relegated.

Managerial changes

League table

Results

Statistics

Top scorers

Hat-tricks

Notes

References

External links
 Match schedule

Girabola seasons
Girabola
Angola